The Golden Globe Award for Best Actor in a Motion Picture – Musical or Comedy is a Golden Globe Award presented annually by the Hollywood Foreign Press Association. It is given in honor of an actor who has delivered an outstanding performance in a leading role in a musical or comedy film. Previously, there was a single award for "Best Actor in a Motion Picture", but the creation of the category in 1951 allowed for recognition of it and the Best Actor – Drama.

The formal title has varied since its inception. In 2006, it was officially called: "Best Performance by an Actor in a Motion Picture – Musical or Comedy". , the wording is "Best Actor in a Motion Picture – Musical  or Comedy".

Winners and nominees

1950s

1960s

1970s

1980s

1990s

2000s

2010s

2020s

Multiple nominations

10 nominations
 Jack Lemmon

9 nominations
 Johnny Depp

8 nominations
 Walter Matthau

6 nominations
 Dustin Hoffman

5 nominations
 Jim Carrey
 Cary Grant
 Steve Martin
 Robin Williams

4 nominations
 Michael Caine
 Robert De Niro
 Hugh Grant
 Danny Kaye
 Kevin Kline
 Eddie Murphy
 Bill Murray
 Jack Nicholson
 Peter O'Toole
 Peter Sellers
 John Travolta

3 nominations
 Christian Bale
 Warren Beatty
 Nicolas Cage
 Billy Crystal
 Jeff Daniels
 Leonardo DiCaprio
 Colin Farrell
 Albert Finney
 Ryan Gosling
 Tom Hanks
 Bob Hope
 Hugh Jackman
 Marcello Mastroianni
 Dudley Moore
 Joaquin Phoenix
 Patrick Swayze
 Glenn Ford

2 nominations
 Alan Alda
 Woody Allen
 Fred Astaire
 Antonio Banderas
 Sacha Baron Cohen
 Jack Black
 Mel Brooks
 Steve Carell
 Daniel Craig
 Bing Crosby
 Tom Cruise
 Matt Damon
 Danny DeVito
 Michael Douglas
 Richard Dreyfuss
 Ralph Fiennes
 James Franco
 Clark Gable
 James Garner
 Richard Gere
 Paul Giamatti
 Brendan Gleeson
 Joseph Gordon-Levitt
 Charles Grodin
 George Hamilton
 Rex Harrison
 Charlton Heston
 Nathan Lane
 Harold Lloyd
 Lee Marvin
 Lin-Manuel Miranda
 James Mason
 Ewan McGregor
 David Niven
 Al Pacino
 Robert Preston
 John C. Reilly
 Burt Reynolds
 Tim Robbins
 Alberto Sordi
 Kevin Spacey
 Billy Bob Thornton
 Gene Wilder

Multiple wins

3 wins
 Jack Lemmon (2 consecutive)
 Robin Williams

2 wins
 Michael Caine
 Colin Farrell
 Danny Kaye
 Dudley Moore
 Jack Nicholson
 Sacha Baron Cohen (for the same character)

See also
 Academy Award for Best Actor
 Critics' Choice Movie Award for Best Actor
 Independent Spirit Award for Best Male Lead
 BAFTA Award for Best Actor in a Leading Role
 Critics' Choice Movie Award for Best Actor in a Comedy
 Golden Globe Award for Best Actor – Motion Picture Drama
 Screen Actors Guild Award for Outstanding Performance by a Male Actor in a Leading Role

References

Golden Globe Awards
 
Film awards for lead actor